Gerald Gary "Jed" Mercurio  (born September 1966) is a British television writer, producer, director and novelist. A former hospital doctor and Royal Air Force officer, Mercurio has been ranked among UK television's leading writers. In 2017, Mercurio was awarded a Fellowship of the Royal Television Society and the Baird Medal by RTS Midlands.

His works for television include the series Line of Duty, Bodyguard, Bodies (based on his 2002 novel), The Grimleys, and Cardiac Arrest. His books are Bodies (2002), Ascent (2007), American Adulterer (2009) and, for children, The Penguin Expedition (2003).

Early life 
Mercurio was born in Nelson, Lancashire, but grew up in Cannock, Staffordshire. His parents were Italian immigrants, with his father working as a coal miner. He studied at the University of Birmingham Medical School. During his third year, in August 1988, he was commissioned as a pilot officer in the Royal Air Force Medical Branch. He received flying training with the University Air Squadron, with the intention of specialising in aviation medicine. He was promoted to flying officer in June 1991, but resigned his commission in February 1992.

During practice as a hospital physician, Mercurio answered an advertisement in the British Medical Journal and, despite little writing experience, scripted the BBC medical drama Cardiac Arrest under the pseudonym John MacUre. Subsequently he retired from medicine to pursue a writing career under his own name.

Career 
Mercurio's writing debut, Cardiac Arrest (1994–96), caused controversy due to its realistic depiction of hospital life. The series was twice nominated in the Best Original Drama category by the Writers' Guild of Great Britain and topped a poll of UK medical professionals as the most realistic medical drama of all time. Mercurio served as medical adviser on the second series of Cardiac Arrest, which he cites as his apprenticeship in producing/directing.

Jed Mercurio entered a new genre when he created The Grimleys, a comedy series set in the Black Country, which ran for three series (1999–2001) on ITV.

Mercurio adapted his first novel, Bodies (2002), into an award-winning television series. Mercurio assumed the producer/showrunner position for the first time on Bodies (2004–06), a role he has fulfilled on all his subsequent original series. The Times ranked Bodies in "Shows of the Decade" and The Guardian placed it in "The Greatest TV Dramas of All Time." The series won the Royal Television Society Award for Best Drama Series, was twice nominated for the BAFTA Award for Best Drama Series and Mercurio was also twice nominated as Best Drama Writer by the Royal Television Society.

His critically acclaimed second novel, Ascent (2007), was ranked among the 1000 Novels Everyone Must Read.

Mercurio's next original drama series, Line of Duty (first broadcast 26 June 2012), premiered as BBC2's then best-performing drama series in 10 years with 4.1 million viewers. A well-received second series (first broadcast 12 February 2014) resulted in the BBC commissioning two further series for production in 2015 and 2016. The first series was nominated for a Royal Television Society Award for Best Drama Series and earned Mercurio his third nomination as Best Drama Writer by the Royal Television Society and The Writers' Guild of Great Britain.  In 2014, Line of Duty was named in the Top 50 BBC2 Shows of All-Time, and named best television drama of the year by The Observer, and in 2016 ranked among the best BBC shows of all time and among the best police series of all time.  In 2015, the second series won the Royal Television Society Award for Best Drama Series. and was nominated for four BAFTA Awards. Series 3 of Line of Duty became the most watched drama series broadcast on BBC2 in the multichannel era. Series 4 transferred to BBC One, consisting of six episodes broadcast from 26 March 2017.

Mercurio's third medical drama series, Critical, ran for 13 episodes on Sky1 from 24 February 2015 to predominantly positive reviews, but was cancelled on 15 July 2015 after one season.

Mercurio created and wrote Bodyguard, serving as showrunner on the six-part series starring Richard Madden and Keeley Hawes. The series began broadcasting on BBC One on 26 August 2018, achieving the highest viewing figures for a new BBC drama in the multichannel era.

Mercurio was appointed Officer of the Order of the British Empire (OBE) in the 2021 New Year Honours for services to television drama.

More recently, he and Jimmy Mulville, via HTM Television inked a first look deal with 20th Television in an effort to expand it to the US.

Personal life
Mercurio's long-time partner is Elaine Cameron, a producer and script editor, and they have two children; Jack and Molly Mercurio.

Filmography
 Cardiac Arrest (1994–96)
 The Grimleys (TV sitcom) (1997)
 Invasion: Earth (1998)
 The Grimleys (TV series) (1999–2001)
 The Legend of the Tamworth Two (2004)
 Bodies (2004–2006)
 Frankenstein (2007)
 Strike Back (2010)
 Line of Duty (2012–2021)
 Critical (2015)
 Lady Chatterley's Lover (2015)
 Bodyguard (2018)
 Bloodlands (2021) - Executive Producer
 Stephen (2021) - Executive Producer
 Trigger Point (2022) - Executive Producer
 DI Ray (2022) - Executive Producer

Bibliography
 Bodies (2002)
 The Penguin Expedition (2003)
 Ascent (2007)
 American Adulterer (2009)
 Ascent (graphic novel – with Wesley Robins) (2011)

Awards and nominations

References

External links 
 

1966 births
Living people
Date of birth missing (living people)
British people of Italian descent
English people of Italian descent
People from Nelson, Lancashire
People from Cannock
Alumni of the University of Birmingham
20th-century English medical doctors
English screenwriters
English television directors
English television producers
English novelists
Officers of the Order of the British Empire
Royal Air Force Medical Service officers
Fellows of the Royal Television Society